"Under Pressure" is a song by the British rock band Queen and singer David Bowie. Originally released as a single in October 1981, it was later included on Queen's 1982 album Hot Space. The song reached number one on the UK Singles Chart, becoming Queen's second number-one hit in their home country and Bowie's third, and also charted in the top 10 in more than 10 countries around the world.

The song has been described as a "monster rock track that stood out" on the Hot Space album, as well as "an incredibly powerful and poignant pop song". "Under Pressure" was listed at number 31 on VH1's 100 Greatest Songs of the '80s, and voted the second-best collaboration of all time in a poll by Rolling Stone. In 2021, it was ranked number 429 on Rolling Stones list of The 500 Greatest Songs of All Time. It was played live at every Queen concert from 1981 until the end of the band's touring career in 1986. Live recordings appear on the Queen live albums Queen Rock Montreal and Live at Wembley '86.

The song was included on some editions of Queen's first Greatest Hits compilations, such as the original 1981 Elektra release in North America. It is included on the band's compilation albums Greatest Hits II, Classic Queen, and Absolute Greatest, as well as Bowie compilations such as Best of Bowie (2002), The Platinum Collection (2005), Nothing Has Changed (2014), Legacy (2016), and Re:Call 3 (2017).

"Under Pressure" was sampled by American rapper Vanilla Ice for his 1990 single "Ice Ice Baby". Vanilla Ice initially did not credit Bowie or Queen for the sample, resulting in a lawsuit that gave Bowie and Queen songwriting credit. The song has been covered by American rock bands My Chemical Romance and the Used, and singer Shawn Mendes, whose version featured singer Teddy Geiger. Xiu Xiu also covered the song with Swans frontman Michael Gira, a version that was included on Xiu Xiu's 2008 album Women as Lovers.

Background and composition
"Under Pressure" was recorded at Mountain Studios in Montreux, Switzerland, in July 1981. Queen, working on their 1982 album Hot Space, had been working on a song called "Feel Like", but were not satisfied with the result. While they were there, David Bowie was also at Mountain recording his vocals for "Cat People (Putting Out Fire)", the title song for the 1982 horror film of the same name. The  artists ran into each other during the session. Bowie sang backing vocals for Queen's song "Cool Cat", but his vocals were removed from the final song because he was not satisfied with his performance. Afterward, they worked together for a while and wrote the song. It was credited as being co-written by the five musicians. The scat singing that dominates much of the song is evidence of the jam-beginnings as improvisation. However, according to Queen bassist John Deacon (as quoted in a French magazine in 1984), the song's primary musical songwriter was Freddie Mercury – though all contributed to the arrangement. As Brian May recalled to Mojo magazine in October 2008, "It was hard, because you had four very precocious boys and David, who was precocious enough for all of us. David took over the song lyrically. Looking back, it's a great song, but it should have been mixed differently. Freddie and David had a fierce battle over that. It's a significant song because of David and its lyrical content." The earlier, embryonic version of the song without Bowie, "Feel Like", is widely available in bootleg form, and was written by Queen drummer Roger Taylor.

Also, some confusion has arisen about who had created the song's bassline. John Deacon said (in Japanese magazine Music life in 1982) that David Bowie created it. In more recent interviews, Brian May and Roger Taylor credited the bass riff to Deacon. Bowie, on his website, said the bassline was already written before he became involved. Roger Taylor, in an interview for the BBC documentary Queen: The Days of Our Lives, stated that Deacon did indeed create the bassline, and that all through the sessions in the studio, he had been playing the riff over and over. He also claims that when the band returned from dinner, Deacon misremembered the riff, but Taylor was still able to remember it. Brian May clarified matters in a 2016 article for Mirror Online, writing that it was actually Bowie, not Taylor, who had inadvertently changed the riff. The riff began as "Deacy began playing, 6 notes the same, then one note a fourth down". After the dinner break, Bowie changed Deacon's memory of the riff to "Ding-Ding-Ding Diddle Ing-Ding".

Reception 
"Under Pressure" has received critical acclaim since its release, with multiple publications ranking it among Queen and Bowie's best songs and among the greatest songs of all time. On release, Sandy Robertson of Sounds  called "Under Pressure" the "cornerstone" of its parent album.  Record World said that "Bowie and Freddie Mercury combine for a spellbinding musical experience." Reviewing Hot Space decades later, Stephen Thomas Erlewine of AllMusic called "Under Pressure" as the album's "undeniable saving grace" and "the only reason most listeners remember this album". He described the song as "an utterly majestic, otherworldly duet... that recaptures the effortless grace of Queen's mid-'70s peak, but is underscored with a truly affecting melancholy heart that gives it a genuine human warmth unheard in much of their music." Similarly, Ned Raggett of AllMusic described the song as "anthemic, showy, and warm-hearted, [and] a clear standout for both acts".

Following Bowie's death in 2016, Jack Hamilton of Slate called "Under Pressure" a "masterpiece" and is a reminder to the public that Bowie could be "wonderfully, powerfully human." Jack Whatley wrote for Far Out Magazine "with all the animosity, wine, cocaine, and vocal battles, which helped come together to birth the song, what remains is an incredibly powerful and poignant pop song that we will likely not see matched in our lifetimes. The two juggernauts of Freddie Mercury and David Bowie collide here with perfect and enriching precision."

The September 2005 edition of online music magazine Stylus singled out the bassline as the best in popular music history. In November 2004, Stylus music critic Anthony Miccio commented that "Under Pressure" "is the best song of all time" and described it as Queen's "opus". In 2012, Slant Magazine listed "Under Pressure" as the 21st best single of the 1980s. It was listed at number 31 on VH1's 100 Greatest Songs of the '80s and voted the second best collaboration of all time in a poll by Rolling Stone magazine. It is ranked number 429 on Rolling Stones list of The 500 Greatest Songs of All Time.

Music video
The music video for the song features neither Queen nor David Bowie due to touring commitments. Taking the theme of pressure, director David Mallet edited together stock footage of traffic jams, commuter trains packed with passengers, explosions, riots, cars being crushed, and various pieces of footage from silent films of the 1920s, most notably Sergei Eisenstein's influential Soviet film Battleship Potemkin, the silent Dr. Jekyll and Mr. Hyde starring John Barrymore, and F.W. Murnau's Nosferatu, a masterpiece of the German Expressionist movement. The video explores the pressure-cooker mentality of a culture willing to wage war against political machines, and at the same time love and have fun (there is also footage of crowds enjoying concerts, and many black and white kissing scenes). Top of the Pops refused to show the video in its original form due to it containing footage of explosions in Northern Ireland, so an edited version was instead shown. In 2003, Slant Magazine ranked "Under Pressure" number 27 among the 100 greatest music videos of all time.

"Ice Ice Baby" sampling controversy

Controversy arose when Vanilla Ice sampled the song's intro bassline and piano chords for his 1990 single "Ice Ice Baby". Initially, he denied the accusation and then said he had modified it but did not originally pay songwriting credit or royalties to Queen and Bowie. A lawsuit resulted in Bowie and all members of Queen receiving songwriting credit for the sample. Vanilla Ice later claimed that he purchased the publishing rights to "Under Pressure", saying that buying the song made more financial sense than paying out royalties, but a Queen spokesman clarified that Vanilla Ice's statement was inaccurate.

Track listing

7": EMI / EMI 5250 (UK) 
Side one
"Under Pressure" (Mercury, May, Taylor, Deacon, Bowie) – 4:08

Side two
"Soul Brother" (Mercury) – 3:38

7": Elektra / E-47235 (US) 
Side one
"Under Pressure" (Mercury, May, Taylor, Deacon, Bowie) – 4:08

Side two
"Soul Brother" (Mercury) – 3:38

1988 3" CD: Parlophone / QUECD9 (UK) 
 "Under Pressure" – 4:08
 "Soul Brother" – 3:40
 "Body Language" – 4:33

Personnel 
According to Bowie biographer Chris O'Leary:
Freddie Mercury – lead and backing vocals, piano, Hammond organ, handclaps, finger snaps
Brian May – electric guitar, handclaps, finger snaps
John Deacon – bass guitar, handclaps, finger snaps
Roger Taylor – drums, backing vocals, handclaps, finger snaps
David Bowie – lead and backing vocals, synthesiser, handclaps, finger snaps
David Richards – piano

Live performances 
Although very much a joint project, only Queen incorporated the song into their live shows at the time. Bowie chose not to perform the song before an audience until the 1992 Freddie Mercury Tribute Concert, when he and Annie Lennox sang it as a duet (backed by the surviving Queen members). However, after Mercury's death and the Outside tour in 1995, Bowie performed the song at virtually every one of his live shows, with bassist Gail Ann Dorsey taking Mercury's vocal part. The song also appeared in set lists from A Reality Tour mounted by Bowie in 2004, when he frequently would dedicate it to Freddie Mercury. Queen + Paul Rodgers have recently performed the song; and in summer of 2012, Queen + Adam Lambert toured, including a performance of the song by Lambert and Roger Taylor in each show. While Bowie was never present for a live performance of the song with Mercury, Taylor instead filled for backing vocals in unison with Mercury, as Mercury took over all of Bowie's parts.

Live recordings 
 Queen first recorded a live full version of the song at the Montreal Forum in Canada on 24 November 1981. This was included in the concert films We Will Rock You and Queen Rock Montreal. Incidentally it is one of the few times in concert where Mercury used falsetto in the song on the line "these are the days it never rains but it pours".
 A second live version of the song was recorded at Milton Keynes, England, in 1982. This was released in 2004 on the live album/DVD Queen on Fire - Live at the Bowl. Prior to the concert, rumours circulated that Bowie would appear with Queen to sing his parts on stage, but he probably did not even attend the concert.
 In September 1982 the band performed the song during an appearance on the eighth-season premiere of Saturday Night Live, which turned out to be Freddie Mercury's final live performance with Queen in the United States.
 Later, Queen recorded a third live version of the song at Wembley Stadium, London, in 1986. This was released on the live album/DVD Live at Wembley Stadium. Another rendition from this same tour (from Queen's concert in Budapest) appeared in edited form on the album Live Magic in 1986. A recording taken from Queen's last gig in Knebworth Park in 1986, appears, albeit in remixed form, as a B-side from second CD single of "Rah Mix" version of this song, released in 1999. (See below)
 During the Freddie Mercury Tribute Concert in 1992, the surviving members of Queen along with Bowie and Annie Lennox (fulfilling Mercury's role) performed the song. The concert was later released on DVD in 2002 for the 10th anniversary.
 A version recorded by David Bowie's live band in 1995 was released on the bonus disc included with some versions of Outside – Version 2. This live version was also released on the single "Hallo Spaceboy" in 1996. Two live recordings from the Outside Tour appear on Bowie's live concert albums Ouvre le Chien (Live Dallas 95) (2020) and No Trendy Réchauffé (Live Birmingham 95) (2020).
 Bowie's 25 June 2000 performance of the song at the Glastonbury Festival was released in 2018 on Glastonbury 2000.
 Bowie's DVD A Reality Tour (2004) and album A Reality Tour (2010) include a November 2003 live version from the A Reality Tour, recorded in Dublin, with Bowie's bassist Gail Ann Dorsey singing Mercury's parts.
 The 2006 VH1 Rock Honors at the Mandalay Bay Events Center in Las Vegas, featured Queen + Paul Rodgers performing "Under Pressure" along with "The Show Must Go On", "We Will Rock You" and "We Are the Champions" as a live broadcast.

Remixes and other releases

Rah Mix
A remixed version (called the "Rah Mix") was issued in December 1999 to promote Queen's Greatest Hits III compilation, reaching No. 14 on the UK Singles Chart. The video for the Rah Mix was directed by DoRo, featuring footage of Freddie Mercury from Queen's Wembley concert on 12 July 1986 and David Bowie at the Freddie Mercury Tribute Concert also at Wembley Stadium on 20 April 1992 spliced together using digital technology (with Annie Lennox carefully edited out). This version is featured on the Greatest Hits III compilation, the Rah Mix CD single (as an Enhanced CD video) and the 2011 iTunes LP edition of Hot Space.

Track listing
Two CD singles (one multimedia enhanced) released 6December 1999 and 7" picture disc released 13 December 1999. As "Bohemian Rhapsody" won The Song of The Millennium award, this was released with Bohemian Rhapsody as B-side 
CDS No. 1
 "Under Pressure (Rah Mix)"
 The Song of the Millennium – "Bohemian Rhapsody"
 "Thank God It's Christmas"

CDS No. 2
 "Under Pressure (Rah Mix – Radio Edit)"
 "Under Pressure (Mike Spencer Mix)"
 "Under Pressure (Knebworth Mix)"
 Enhanced section

7-inch single
 "Under Pressure (Rah Mix)"
 The Song of the Millennium – "Bohemian Rhapsody"

Other releases
 It was initially released in the US on the Elektra Records US and Canadian versions of Queen's Greatest Hits as a new track.
 It was released in the UK on Queen's Greatest Hits II in 1991 (which would later be included in The Platinum Collection (2000, 2002 and 2011) in a version removing the second time David Bowie sings, "This is our last dance."
 It was released as a bonus track on the Virgin Records reissue of Bowie's Let's Dance in 1995.
 Hollywood Records remixed the song for their 1992 release, Classic Queen. This version features improved sound quality but also removes Mercury's interjection "that's okay!" at about 0:53.
 It also appeared on the Bowie compilation Bowie: The Singles 1969-1993 (1993).
 The original single version appears on disc three of Bowie's The Platinum Collection (2005). This disc was later released separately as The Best of David Bowie 1980/1987 (2007).
 The original single version also appears on Bowie's Nothing Has Changed (2014), Legacy (2016), and the Re:Call 3 compilation included in A New Career in a New Town (1977–1982) (2017).
 An instrumental version appears in the DVD menu for the Hot Space section of Greatest Video Hits 2.
 It has also been performed, but without the lyrics, by the Royal Philharmonic Orchestra.
 It was featured nearly in its entirety in the 2010 film It's Kind of a Funny Story, initially as a 'cover' by the patients in a music therapy class at a New York City psychiatric ward, which the film transformed into the authentic song 'performed' by the patients, dressed in glam, in a near music-video style imaginary sequence (with David Bowie and Queen's original vocals and instrumentation).
 Featuring in Happy Feet Two in 2011, the song was also released in the film's soundtrack.
 It is featured nearly in its entirety at the tail of Take Me to the River (2015 film).
 The song featured in the trailer for the 2019 miniseries Good Omens., presumably a nod to Pratchett’s assertion in that novel that, “any cassette tape left in a car inevitably becomes a Best of Queen compilation.”
 The song appears in season 3, episode 6 of Sex Education (2021).
 It was covered by the cast of The Magicians (2018) in season 3, episode 9 – All That Josh.
 The song is featured at the end of the 2022 film, Aftersun, and an instrumental cover of the track is included on the soundtrack titled, "Last Dance".

Other remixes
Mouth Pressure. Released in January 2017 as a part of the Neil Cicierega album Mouth Moods, "Mouth Pressure" pairs the instrumentals from "Under Pressure" with the vocals from Smash Mouth's "All Star".

Percy's Pressure. A karaoke version of the song was released in September as a part of the soundtrack of the animated Warner Brothers musical film Smallfoot whose lyrics detail one of the central human characters Percy's (voiced by James Corden) fall from fame and his need to bounce back. Additional lyrics were written by Karey Kirkpatrick, the film's director, and his brother Wayne Kirkpatrick.

Charts
In the U.K., "Under Pressure" was Queen's second number-one hit and Bowie's third. Queen's smash hit "Bohemian Rhapsody" reached number one in November 1975, just two weeks after Bowie's "Space Oddity" had done the same. Bowie also topped the British charts in August 1980 with "Ashes to Ashes", his answer song to "Space Oddity".

Original version

Weekly charts

Year-end charts

"Rah Mix"

Year-end charts

Certifications

My Chemical Romance and the Used version 

The song was covered in 2005 by American alternative rock bands the Used and My Chemical Romance for tsunami relief. The cover was originally released as an Internet download track but has subsequently been featured as a bonus track on the 2005 re-release of the Used's second studio album In Love and Death, and received wide airplay in 2005.

On the Billboard charts, the single reached number 28 on Modern Rock chart and number 41 on the Hot 100.

Shawn Mendes version 

In October 2018, Canadian singer and songwriter Shawn Mendes featuring American singer and songwriter Teddy Geiger (credited as teddy<3) released a version of the song.

The song was released to coincide with the release of the film Bohemian Rhapsody. Universal Music Group released three tracks by different artists "channeling their inner Freddie Mercury"; this was the first installment, released in October 2018 followed by 5 Seconds of Summer's "Killer Queen" cover track.

A portion of the profits from the "Under Pressure" cover was donated to Mercury Phoenix Trust, which was founded by Queen's Brian May and Roger Taylor (and the group's manager, Jim Beach) after Mercury's death to help fight AIDS worldwide. Mendes said in a statement: "I am so honoured to be able to support the amazing legacy of Freddie and Queen by doing a cover of one of my favourite songs, 'Under Pressure'".

Reception
Taylor Weatherby from Billboard called the track "breezy" and said "Mendes and Geiger put their voices at the forefront of the stripped-down rendition, with Mendes' falsetto and Geiger's 'raspier' tone complementing their plucky acoustic guitars."

References

Sources

External links
Official YouTube videos: 
Original music video
Live at Wembley
Live at The Bowl
At Freddie Mercury Tribute Concert (with Annie Lennox and David Bowie)
 Lyrics of Rah Mix at Queen official website (from Greatest Hits III)

1981 songs
1981 singles
1982 singles
1999 singles
2005 singles
2018 singles
David Bowie songs
Queen (band) songs
Joss Stone songs
My Chemical Romance songs
The Used songs
Shawn Mendes songs
UK Singles Chart number-one singles
Male vocal duets
Songs written by David Bowie
Songs written by Freddie Mercury
Songs written by Brian May
Songs written by John Deacon
Songs written by Roger Taylor (Queen drummer)
Elektra Records singles
Parlophone singles
Reprise Records singles
EMI Records singles
Hollywood Records singles
Virgin EMI Records singles
Music videos directed by David Mallet (director)